Arquettes-en-Val is a commune in the Aude department in the Occitanie region of southern France.

The inhabitants of the commune are known as Arquettois or Arquettoises

The commune is one of the rare ones in France that are free of debt.

Geography

Arquettes-sur-Val is located some 16 km south-east of Carcassonne and 4 km south-west of Montlaur. Access to the commune is by the D42 road from Palaja in the north-west passing through the commune and the village and continuing south to Serviès-en-Val. The D114 goes north-east from Serviès-en-Val to form part of the eastern border of the commune before joining the D3. The D714 road connects the D3 east of the commune to the village. The D310 goes south-west from the village to Villetritouls. The commune is rugged and forested in the north-west giving way to farmland in the south-east.

The Ruisseau des Lys rises in the north-east of the commune and flows south-east gathering many tributaries. The Ruisseau de Jonquiere rises near the village and flows south-east. The Ruisseau de Lanes rises in the north-west of the commune and also flows south-west gathering many tributaries. All of the streams join the Sou south-west of the commune.

Neighbouring communes and villages

History

Heraldry

Administration

List of Successive Mayors

Demography
In 2017 the commune had 79 inhabitants.

Religious heritage

The Church contains a Chasuble, Stole, Maniple, and Bourse de Corporal (17th century) which are registered as an historical object.

Notable people linked to the commune
Oliver de Termes (1200-1274), Lord of Termes and Arquettes-en-Val.
Émile Pouytès, born at Rieux-Minervois on 1 June 1924, died at Montredon-des-Corbières on 4 March 1976. a winemaker in Arquettes-en-Val who attended a viticultural protest by winegrowers and was killed.  There is a commemoration on the 1st Sunday of March at the Montredon-des-Corbières bridge.

See also
 Val de Dagne
 Corbières AOC
 Communes of the Aude department

References

External links
Arquettes-en-Val on the National Geographic Institute website 
Arquettes-en-Val on Géoportail, National Geographic Institute (IGN) website 
Arquetes on the 1750 Cassini Map

Communes of Aude